Darryl Williams may refer to:

Darryl Williams (advocate) (born 1964), social justice and accessibility advocate
Darryl Williams (center) (born 1997), American football player
Darryl Williams (ice hockey) (born 1968), Canadian ice hockey player
Darryl Williams (safety) (born 1970), American football player
Darryl A. Williams, United States Army general
 Darryl Tyree Williams, man who died in North Carolina

See also
 Darrel Williams (born 1995), American football running back
Daryl Williams (disambiguation)
Darrell Williams (disambiguation)